Private School of Professional Psychology was a private university in Tallinn, Estonia.
The school aims Adults in professional training in the field of psychological counseling, and professional training in the field of counseling and psychotherapy

See also
List of universities in Estonia

External links
 

Universities and colleges in Estonia
1995 establishments in Estonia
Educational institutions established in 1995
Education in Tallinn